This list of bridges in the United States is organized by state and includes notable bridges (both existing and destroyed) in the United States. There are more than 600,000 bridges in the U.S.

Alabama
Alamuchee-Bellamy Covered Bridge
Battleship Parkway, Mobile
Captain William J. Hudson "Steamboat Bill" Memorial Bridges, Decatur
Clarkson–Legg Covered Bridge
Clement C. Clay Bridge
Cochrane–Africatown USA Bridge, Mobile
Coldwater Covered Bridge
Comer Bridge
Dauphin Island Bridge, near Mobile
Easley Covered Bridge
Edmund Pettus Bridge, Selma
General W.K. Wilson Jr. Bridge, carrying Interstate 65 over the Mobile and Tensaw River deltas north of Mobile
Gilliland-Reese Covered Bridge
Half Chance Iron Bridge
Horton Mill Covered Bridge
Hugh R. Thomas Bridge
Jubilee Parkway, Mobile
Kymulga Mill & Covered Bridge
Lidy Walker Covered Bridge
Nectar Covered Bridge
Norfolk Southern Tennessee River Bridge
Oakachoy Covered Bridge
Old Union Crossing Covered Bridge
Paul Bryant Bridge
Ross Creek Bridge
Salem-Shotwell Covered Bridge
Swann Covered Bridge
Tallahatchee Covered Bridge
Waldo Covered Bridge
Woolsey Finnell Bridge

See also
List of bridges documented by the Historic American Engineering Record in Alabama
List of bridges on the National Register of Historic Places in Alabama
List of crossings of the Tennessee River
Waterways forming and crossings of the Gulf Intracoastal Waterway

Alaska

Brotherhood Bridge
Captain William Moore Bridge
E. L. Patton Yukon River Bridge
Gravina Island Bridge, Ketchikan to Gravina Island
Hurricane Gulch Bridge
John O'Connell Bridge
Juneau-Douglas Bridge, Juneau
Knik Arm Bridge
Mears Memorial Bridge
Miles Glacier Bridge (Million Dollar Bridge), Cordova
Susitna River Bridge

See also
List of bridges documented by the Historic American Engineering Record in Alaska
List of bridges on the National Register of Historic Places in Alaska

Arizona

Black Suspension Bridge
Cameron Suspension Bridge
Cedar Canyon Bridge
Chevelon Creek Bridge
Ciénega Bridge
Corduroy Creek Bridge
Fossil Creek Bridge
Gillespie Dam Bridge, Maricopa County, Arizona
Glen Canyon Dam Bridge, Page, at the Glen Canyon Dam
Grand Canyon Skywalk
London Bridge, Lake Havasu City
Mike O'Callaghan–Pat Tillman Memorial Bridge (Arizona-Nevada border)
Mill Avenue Bridges
Navajo Bridge, Colorado River, near Lee's Ferry
Ocean to Ocean Bridge
Old Trails Bridge
Park Avenue Bridge
Perkinsville Bridge
Sand Hollow Wash Bridge
Verde River Bridge
Winkelman Bridge

See also
List of bridges documented by the Historic American Engineering Record in Arizona
List of bridges on the National Register of Historic Places in Arizona

Arkansas
Amboy Overpass
AR 289 Bridge Over English Creek
Arkansas Highway 57 Bridge
Beaver Bridge
Benjamin G. Humphreys Bridge
Big Bottom Slough Bridge
Big Dam Bridge, Little Rock
Big Piney Creek Bridge
Black River Bridge
Broadway Bridge
Buffalo River Bridge
Cache River Bridge
Cane Hill Road Bridge
Cannon Creek Bridge
Cedar Creek Bridge (Petit Jean State Park)
Cedar Creek Bridge (Rosie)
Central Avenue
Charles W. Dean Bridge
Coon Creek Bridge
Coop Creek Bridge
Cotter Bridge
Cove Creek Bridge (Corley)
Cove Creek Bridge (Martinville)
Cove Creek Tributary Bridge
Cove Lake Spillway Dam-Bridge
Craighead County Road 513C Bridge
Crooked Creek Bridge
Crowley's Ridge State Park-Bridge
DeGray Creek Bridge
Edgemere Street Bridge
Evansville-Dutch Mills Road Bridge
Fourche LaFave River Bridge
Frisco Bridge
Frog Bayou Bridge
Goff Farm Stone Bridge
Greenville Bridge
Hackett Creek Bridge
Haggard Ford Swinging Bridge
Hale Creek Bridge
Harahan Bridge
Harp Creek Bridge
Helena Bridge
Hernando de Soto Bridge, Memphis to Mound City
Highway 79 Bridge
Highway B-1, Little Telico Creek Bridge
Highway B-29 Bridge
Illinois River Bridge (Pedro)
Illinois River Bridge (Siloam Springs)
Illinois River Bridge at Phillips Ford
Judsonia Bridge
Lafayette Street Overpass
Lake Catherine State Park-Bridge No. 2
Lake No. 1 Bridge
Lakeshore Drive Bridge
Lee Creek Bridge (Natural Dam)
Lee Creek Bridge (Van Buren)
Lincoln Avenue Viaduct
Little Buffalo River Bridge
Little Cossatot River Bridge
Little Cypress Creek Bridge
Little Missouri River Bridge
Main Street Bridge
Maple Street Overpass
Marr's Creek Bridge
Middle Fork of the Little Red River Bridge
Milltown Bridge
Mountain Fork Bridge
Mulberry River Bridge (Pleasant Hill)
Mulberry River Bridge (Turner's Bend)
Mulladay Hollow Bridge
Newport Bridge
North Fork Bridge
North Jackson Street Bridge
North Sylamore Creek Bridge
North Washington Street Bridge
Old Benton-Sardis Road Bridge
Old Highway 16 Bridge
Old River Bridge
Osage Creek Bridge
Ouachita River Bridge
Petit Jean River Bridge (Logan County)
Petit Jean River Bridge (Yell County)
Red River Bridge
Rennic Road Bridge
Rock Island Bridge
Sebastian County Road 4G Bridge
Self Creek Bridge
Short Mountain Creek Bridge
South Fork Bridge
South Fourche LaFave River Bridge
Spring Lake Bridge
Spring River Bridge
Springfield Bridge
St. Francis River Bridge (Lake City)
St. Francis River Bridge (Madison)
St. Louis-San Francisco Overpass
State Highway 96 Bridge
State Highway 274 Bridge
Sylamore Creek Bridge
U.S. 62 White River Bridge
U.S. 64 Horsehead Creek Bridge
US 62 Bridge over Crooked Creek
US 63 Black River Bridge
US 67 Bridge over Little Missouri River
Van Buren County Road 2E Bridge
Wallace Bridge
War Eagle Bridge
War Eagle Creek Bridge
Ward's Crossing Bridge
Warrens Bridge
Waterside Street Bridge
West James Street Overpass
White River Bridge at Elkins
Woolsey Bridge
Yancopin Bridge

See also
List of bridges documented by the Historic American Engineering Record in Arkansas
List of bridges on the National Register of Historic Places in Arkansas

California

Antioch Bridge, San Francisco Bay Area
Benicia–Martinez Bridge, San Francisco Bay Area
Bixby Creek Bridge, State Route 1 in Big Sur
Bridgeport Covered Bridge, Grass Valley
Carquinez Bridge, San Francisco Bay Area
Cold Spring Canyon Arch Bridge, Santa Barbara County
Confusion Hill Bridges, Mendocino County, crossing the South Fork Eel River
Dumbarton Bridge, San Francisco Bay Area
Dumbarton Rail Bridge (decommissioned), San Francisco Bay Area
Felton Covered Bridge, Felton
Foresthill Bridge, Auburn
Golden Gate Bridge, San Francisco Bay Area
Muir Trestle, Martinez
Richmond–San Rafael Bridge, San Francisco Bay Area
San Mateo–Hayward Bridge, San Francisco Bay Area
San Diego–Coronado Bridge, San Diego
San Francisco–Oakland Bay Bridge, San Francisco Bay Area
Sixth Street Viaduct, Los Angeles
Sundial Bridge, Redding
Tower Bridge, Sacramento
Vincent Thomas Bridge, San Pedro

Colorado
Cherry Creek Bridge
Dolores River Bridge
Maroon Creek Bridge
Middle Bridge
Red Cliff Bridge
Royal Gorge Bridge – World's second highest suspension bridge
Slate Creek Bridge
South Canon Bridge

See also
List of bridges documented by the Historic American Engineering Record in Colorado
List of bridges on the National Register of Historic Places in Colorado

Connecticut

Amtrak/Springfield Terminal Railroad Bridge, Enfield to Suffield
Arrigoni Bridge, Portland to Middletown
Bissell Bridge, Windsor to South Windsor
Bulkeley Bridge, Hartford
Charter Oak Bridge, Hartford to East Hartford
Connecticut Southern railroad bridge, Hartford
Dexter Coffin Bridge, Windsor Locks to East Windsor
East Haddam Bridge, East Haddam (reputed to be the longest swingbridge in the world)
Enfield–Suffield Veterans Bridge, Enfield to Suffield
Founders Bridge, Hartford
Gold Star Bridge, New London to Groton
Igor I. Sikorsky Memorial Bridge, Stratford
Mystic River Bascule Bridge, Mystic
Mianus River Bridge
Pearl Harbor Memorial Bridge, New Haven
Providence & Worcester railroad bridge Middletown
Raymond E. Baldwin Bridge, Old Saybrook to Old Lyme
Saugatuck River Bridge, a swing bridge
Washington Bridge, Milford and Stratford
West Cornwall Covered Bridge, Cornwall
William H. Putnam Memorial Bridge, Wethersfield to Glastonbury

See also
List of bridges documented by the Historic American Engineering Record in Connecticut
List of bridges of the Merritt Parkway
List of bridges on the National Register of Historic Places in Connecticut
List of crossings of the Connecticut River
List of crossings of the Housatonic River
List of waterways forming and crossings of the Atlantic Intracoastal Waterway

Delaware

Chesapeake & Delaware Canal Lift Bridge, railroad bridge
Delaware Memorial Bridge, New Castle to Deepwater, New Jersey
Indian River Inlet Bridge, Bethany Beach to Dewey Beach
Reedy Point Bridge, Delaware City to Port Penn
Senator William V. Roth Jr. Bridge, St. Georges
South Market Street Bridge, Wilmington
St. Georges Bridge, St. Georges
Summit Bridge, Glasgow to Middletown
Wilmington Rail Viaduct, Wilmington
Ashland covered bridge

See also
List of bridges documented by the Historic American Engineering Record in Delaware
List of bridges on the National Register of Historic Places in Delaware
List of waterways forming and crossings of the Atlantic Intracoastal Waterway

District of Columbia
11th Street Bridges
14th Street Bridge
Arlington Memorial Bridge
Chain Bridge
Dumbarton Bridge
Francis Scott Key Bridge
Frederick Douglass Memorial Bridge
John Philip Sousa Bridge
Taft Bridge
Theodore Roosevelt Bridge
Whitney Young Memorial Bridge
Woodrow Wilson Bridge (mostly in Maryland)

See also
List of bridges documented by the Historic American Engineering Record in Washington, D.C.
List of bridges on the National Register of Historic Places in Washington, D.C.
List of crossings of the Potomac River

Florida

17th Street Bridge, Vero Beach
Acosta Bridge, Jacksonville
Bayside Bridge, Clearwater
Bridge of Lions, St. Augustine
Broadway Bridge, Daytona Beach
Buckman Bridge, Jacksonville
Caloosahatchee Bridge, Fort Myers
Cape Coral Bridge, Fort Myers to Cape Coral
Clearwater Memorial Causeway, Clearwater
Courtney Campbell Causeway, Clearwater to Tampa
Dames Point Bridge, Jacksonville
Eau Gallie Causeway, Melbourne
Escambia Bay Bridge, Pensacola
Fuller Warren Bridge, Jacksonville
Gandy Bridge, St. Petersburg to Tampa
Hal W. Adams Bridge, Suwannee River between Lafayette and Suwannee counties, Florida'a first suspension bridge
Hart Bridge, Jacksonville
Howard Frankland Bridge, Tampa
Julia Tuttle Causeway, Miami Beach
Knox Memorial Bridge, Volusia County
MacArthur Causeway, Miami Beach
Main Street Bridge, Jacksonville
Mathews Bridge, Jacksonville
Melbourne Causeway, Melbourne to Indialantic
Merrill P. Barber Bridge, Vero Beach
Mid-Bay Bridge, Choctawhatchee Bay, Destin to Niceville
Midpoint Memorial Bridge, Lee County
Overseas Highway, Florida Keys
Pensacola Bay Bridge, Pensacola to Gulf Breeze
Rickenbacker Causeway, Key Biscayne
Roosevelt Bridge, Stuart
Sanibel Causeway, Lee County
Sebastian Inlet Bridge, Indian River County
Seven Mile Bridge, Florida Keys
Shands Bridge, Green Cove Springs
St. George Island Bridge, Franklin County
St. Johns River Veterans Memorial Bridge, Sanford
Sunshine Skyway Bridge, St. Petersburg to Bradenton
Treasure Island Causeway, Treasure Island to St. Petersburg
Venetian Causeway, Miami Beach
Wabasso Bridge, Wabasso

See also
List of bridges on the National Register of Historic Places in Florida
List of crossings of the Aucilla River
List of crossings of the Halifax River
List of crossings of the St. Johns River
List of crossings of the Ochlockonee River
List of crossings of the Suwannee River
List of waterways forming and crossings of the Atlantic Intracoastal Waterway
List of waterways forming and crossings of the Gulf Intracoastal Waterway

Georgia

Browns Bridge, Gainesville
Butt Memorial Bridge, Augusta
Dorothy Barnes Pelote Bridge, Savannah
Euharlee Covered Bridge, Euharlee
Georgia–Carolina Memorial Bridge, South Carolina state line, Elbert County, east-southeast of Elberton
Herschel Lovett Bridge, Dublin–East Dublin city line
Howard's Covered Bridge, Oglethorpe County
Poole's Mill Covered Bridge, Forsyth County
Price–Legg Bridge, Lincoln–Columbia county line
Sand Bar Ferry Bridge, South Carolina state line, Richmond County, Augusta
Shallowford Bridge, Blue Ridge
Sidney Lanier Bridge, Brunswick
Spook Bridge, Brooks County-Lowndes county line
Stovall Mill Covered Bridge, White County
Talmadge Memorial Bridge, Savannah
Tom Moreland Interchange, also known as "Spaghetti Junction", Atlanta
Watson Mill Bridge, Madison County

See also
Historic bridges of the Atlanta area
List of bridges documented by the Historic American Engineering Record in Georgia (U.S. state)
List of bridges on the National Register of Historic Places in Georgia
List of covered bridges in Georgia (U.S. state)
List of waterways forming and crossings of the Atlantic Intracoastal Waterway

Guam

Hawaii

Admiral Clarey Bridge
Opaekaa Road Bridge
Pu'u'opae Bridge
Windward Viaducts

See also
List of bridges documented by the Historic American Engineering Record in Hawaii
List of bridges on the National Register of Historic Places in Hawaii

Illinois
Abraham Lincoln Memorial Bridge, LaSalle/Peru
Bob Michel Bridge, Peoria
Canal Street railroad bridge (Pennsylvania Railroad Bridge No. 458), Chicago
Cedar Street Bridge, Peoria
Cherry Avenue Bridge (Chicago, Milwaukee & St. Paul Railway, Bridge No. Z-2), Chicago
Chicago Skyway 'High Bridge', Chicago
Clark Bridge, Alton
Clark Street Bridge, Chicago
Cortland Street Drawbridge, Chicago
Dearborn Street Bridge, Chicago
Franklin Street Bridge, Chicago
Hazen Bridge (Newcomb Bridge), Mahomet
John T. McNaughton Bridge, Pekin
Kinzie Street railroad bridge (Chicago and North Western Railway), Chicago
La Salle Street Bridge (Marshall Suloway Bridge), Chicago
Lyndon Bridge, Lyndon
McClugage Bridge (Ironworkers' Memorial Bridge), Peoria
Murray Baker Bridge, Peoria
North Avenue Bridge, Chicago
Ottawa Rail Bridge, Ottawa
Outer Drive Bridge, Chicago
St. Charles Air Line Bridge, Chicago
Shade-Lohmann Bridge, Peoria
Shippingsport Bridge, LaSalle
Stan Musial Veterans Memorial Bridge, St. Clair County
State Street Bridge, Chicago
Wells Street Bridge, Chicago

See also
List of bridges documented by the Historic American Engineering Record in Illinois
List of bridges on the National Register of Historic Places in Illinois
List of crossings of the Upper Mississippi River
Bridges in Peoria, Illinois

Indiana

Cataract Falls Covered Bridge, Owen County, Indiana, listed on the National Register
John F. Kennedy Memorial Bridge, Jeffersonville to Louisville, Kentucky
Laughery Creek Bridge, Dearborn County; only known example of a Triple Whipple Truss bridge in the world
Lincoln Memorial Bridge, downtown Vincennes to Illinois (old US 50)
Parke County Covered Bridges
Sherman Minton Bridge, New Albany to Louisville, Kentucky
William H. Natcher Bridge, Rockport to Owensboro, Kentucky
Tulip Viaduct, Solsberry, Indiana, longest railroad trestle in U.S.

See also
List of bridges documented by the Historic American Engineering Record in Indiana
List of bridges on the National Register of Historic Places in Indiana
List of crossings of the Ohio River
List of Indiana covered bridges

Iowa
Bellevue Bridge, connects Mills County, Iowa and Sarpy County, Nebraska at Bellevue, Nebraska
Black Hawk Bridge, Lansing
Clinton Railroad Bridge, connects Clinton, Iowa and Fulton (Albany), Illinois
Crescent Rail Bridge,  connects Davenport, Iowa to Rock Island, Illinois
Davenport Skybridge, Davenport
Dubuque-Wisconsin Bridge, connects Dubuque, Iowa to Grant County, Wisconsin
Fort Madison Toll Bridge, connects Fort Madison, Iowa to Niota, Illinois
Fred Schwengel Memorial Bridge connects LeClaire, Iowa to Rapids City, Illinois
Gateway Bridge, connects Clinton, Iowa to Fulton, Illinois
Government Bridge, Davenport, Iowa to Rock Island, Illinois
Great River Bridge, connects Burlington, Iowa to Gulf Port, Illinois
I-74 Bridge, Bettendorf, Iowa to Moline, Illinois
Julien Dubuque Bridge, connects Dubuque, Iowa to East Dubuque, Illinois
Keokuk-Hamilton Bridge, connects Keokuk, Iowa to Hamilton, Illinois
Lyons-Fulton Bridge, connects Clinton, Iowa to Fulton, Illinois
Marquette-Joliet Bridge, connects Marquette, Iowa to Prairie du Chien, Wisconsin
Nebraska City Bridge, connects Otoe County, Nebraska with Fremont County, Iowa at Nebraska City, Nebraska
Norbert F. Beckey Bridge, connects Muscatine, Iowa to Rock Island County, Illinois
Plattsmouth Bridge, connects Cass County, Nebraska to Mills County, Iowa
Rock Island Centennial Bridge, connects Davenport, Iowa to Rock Island, Illinois
Savanna-Sabula Bridge, connects Savanna, Illinois to Sabula, Iowa
Siouxland Veterans Memorial Bridge (formerly Combination Bridge), connects Sioux City, Iowa to South Sioux City, Nebraska
Union Pacific Missouri River Bridge, connects Council Bluffs, Iowa to Omaha, Nebraska

See also
List of bridges documented by the Historic American Engineering Record in Iowa
List of bridges on the National Register of Historic Places in Iowa
List of crossings of the Mississippi River
List of covered bridges in Madison County, Iowa

Kansas
12th Street Bridge, a girder bridge in Kansas City
18th Street Expressway Bridge, a one-level deck truss bridge over the Kansas River in Kansas City
23rd Street viaduct, a one-level, four-lane deck truss bridge over the Kansas River and Kemper Arena in Kansas City
7th Street Trafficway Bridge, a one-level deck truss bridge over the Kansas River in Kansas City
Central Avenue Bridge, a two-level deck truss bridge over the Kansas River
Highline Bridge, a one-level deck truss bridge on the KCTR railroad
Intercity Viaduct, a two-level deck truss bridge over the Kansas River and sister bridge to the Lewis and Clark Viaduct
James Street Bridge, a girder bridge over the Kansas River in Kansas City
Kansas Avenue Bridge, a multi-beam girder over the Kansas River
Kansas City Southern Bridge, a three-span bridge over the Kansas River
Lewis and Clark Viaduct, a deck truss bridge over the Kansas River and sister bridge to the Intercity Viaduct
Rock Island Bridge, a three-span bridge over the Kansas River

See also
List of bridges documented by the Historic American Engineering Record in Kansas
List of bridges on the National Register of Historic Places in Kansas

Kentucky
The Bi-State Vietnam Gold Star Twin Bridges, connecting Henderson, Kentucky with Evansville, Indiana
Ben Williamson Memorial Bridge, parallel cantilever bridge connecting Coal Grove, Ohio to Ashland, Kentucky
Brent Spence Bridge, Cincinnati to Lexington, Kentucky and Louisville, Kentucky
Clay Wade Bailey Bridge, Cincinnati to Covington, Kentucky
Daniel Carter Beard Bridge, Cincinnati to Newport, Kentucky
George Rogers Clark Memorial Bridge, connects downtown Louisville, Kentucky to Clarksville, Indiana
John A. Roebling Suspension Bridge, Cincinnati to Covington, Kentucky
John F. Kennedy Memorial Bridge, connects Louisville, Kentucky to Clarksville, Indiana
Newport Southbank Bridge, the world's longest pedestrian-only bridge, connects Newport, Kentucky to Cincinnati, Ohio
Owensboro Bridge, Owensboro, Kentucky to Spencer County
Sherman Minton Bridge, double-decked dual suspended arch bridge connecting Louisville, Kentucky to New Albany, Indiana
Simeon Willis Memorial Bridge, cantilever parallel bridge connecting Ashland, Kentucky to Coal Grove, Ohio
Simon Kenton Memorial Bridge, connects Maysville, Kentucky to Aberdeen, Ohio
The Singing Bridge crosses the Kentucky River in Frankfort.
Taylor Southgate Bridge, Cincinnati to Newport, Kentucky
William H. Harsha Bridge, connects Maysville, Kentucky to Aberdeen, Ohio
William H. Natcher Bridge, connects Owensboro, Kentucky to Rockport, Indiana via U.S. 231

See also
List of bridges documented by the Historic American Engineering Record in Kentucky
List of bridges on the National Register of Historic Places in Kentucky
List of crossings of the Ohio River
List of crossings of the Tennessee River

Louisiana
 Almonaster Avenue Bridge, New Orleans
 Atchafalaya Basin Bridge, crosses the Atchafalaya Basin to connect Iberville Parish and St. Martin Parish; eighth longest bridge in the world by length: 
 Caddo Lake Drawbridge, Mooringsport
 Chacahoula Swamp Bridge, Terrebonne Parish
 Claiborne Avenue Bridge, New Orleans
 CNR Bonnet Carré Spillway-Baton Rouge Bridge, St. Charles Parish
 CNR Bonnet Carré Spillway-McComb Bridge, St. Charles Parish
 Crescent City Connection, New Orleans
 Danziger Bridge, New Orleans
 Florida Avenue Bridge, New Orleans
 Gramercy Bridge, St. James Parish, St. John the Baptist Parish
 Green Bridge, New Orleans and St. Bernard Parish
 Hale Boggs Memorial Bridge, Luling and Destrehan, St. Charles Parish
 Horace Wilkinson Bridge, Baton Rouge
 Huey P. Long Bridge, Baton Rouge – carries four lanes of U.S. Route 190 across the Mississippi River. Two railroad trestles.
 Huey P. Long Bridge, Jefferson Parish – one of the longest railroad bridges in the US: 
 I-10 Bonnet Carré Spillway Bridge, St. Charles Parish – carries Interstate 10 over the Bonnet Carré Spillway, Lake Pontchartrain and LaBranche Wetlands
 I-10 High Rise Bridge, New Orleans – crosses the Industrial Canal
 I-10 Twin Span Bridge, New Orleans to Slidell
 I-210 Calcasieu River High Bridge, Lake Charles
 John James Audubon Bridge, Pointe Coupee Parish and West Feliciana Parish
 Kansas City Southern Bonnet Carré Spillway Bridge, St. Charles Parish
 LaBranche Wetlands Bridge, St. Charles Parish – carries Interstate 310 over the LaBranche Wetlands
Lake Charles I-10 Bridge, Lake Charles
 Lake Pontchartrain Causeway, Metairie to Mandeville – longest bridge in the world: 
 Louisiana Highway 1 Bridge, Lafourche Parish
 Manchac Swamp bridge, carries Interstate 55 over the Manchac Swamp; second-longest bridge by total length in the world: 
 Natchez-Vidalia Bridge, Vidalia and Natchez, Mississippi
 Norfolk Southern Lake Pontchartrain Bridge – longest railroad bridge in the US: 
 Old Vicksburg Bridge, Delta and Vicksburg, Mississippi
 Seabrook Bridge, New Orleans
 Seabrook Railroad Bridge, New Orleans
 St. Claude Avenue Bridge, New Orleans
 Sunshine Bridge, Sorrento and Donaldsonville
 U.S. 61 Bonnet Carré Spillway Bridge, St. Charles Parish – carries U.S. Route 61 over the Bonnet Carré Spillway
 Vicksburg Bridge, Tallulah and Vicksburg, Mississippi

See also
List of bridges documented by the Historic American Engineering Record in Louisiana
List of bridges on the National Register of Historic Places in Louisiana
List of crossings of the Mississippi River
Waterways forming and crossings of the Gulf Intracoastal Waterway

Maine
Bailey Island Bridge (Cribstone Bridge), Orr's Island to Bailey Island
Casco Bay Bridge, South Portland to Portland
Clair-Fort Kent Bridge
Deer Isle Bridge
Edmundston-Madawaska Bridge
Memorial Bridge, Portsmouth, New Hampshire to Kittery
Million Dollar Bridge, Portland to South Portland
Piscataqua River Bridge, Portsmouth, New Hampshire to Kittery
Penobscot Narrows Bridge, Verona
Sarah Mildred Long Bridge, Portsmouth, New Hampshire to Kittery
Tukey's Bridge, Portland
Two Cent Bridge, Waterville to Winslow
Waldo-Hancock Bridge

See also
List of bridges documented by the Historic American Engineering Record in Maine
List of bridges in Portland, Maine
List of bridges on the National Register of Historic Places in Maine
List of waterways forming and crossings of the Atlantic Intracoastal Waterway

Maryland
American Legion Memorial Bridge, Montgomery County to Fairfax County, Virginia
Burnside's Bridge, Antietam National Battlefield, named after General Ambrose Burnside
Benedict Bridge. Connecting Calvert County to Charles County
Chesapeake Bay Bridge (William Preston Lane, Jr. Memorial Bridge), Anne Arundel County to Queen Anne's County
Chesapeake City Bridge, Chesapeake City
Francis Scott Key Bridge, Baltimore
Governor Harry W. Nice Memorial Bridge, Charles County to Dahlgren, Virginia
Governor Thomas Johnson Bridge. Connecting Calvert County to Saint Marys County
Hanover Street Bridge, spanning the Middle Branch of the Patapsco River in Baltimore
Millard E. Tydings Memorial Bridge, Cecil County
Naval Academy Bridge, Annapolis
Thomas J. Hatem Memorial Bridge, Havre de Grace to Perryville
Union Arch Bridge, Cabin John
Verrazano Bridge, Assateague Island
Woodrow Wilson Bridge, Prince George's County to Alexandria, Virginia

See also
List of bridges documented by the Historic American Engineering Record in Maryland
List of bridges on the National Register of Historic Places in Maryland
List of crossings of the Potomac River
List of waterways forming and crossings of the Atlantic Intracoastal Waterway

Massachusetts
Bascule Bridge, Westport
Berkley-Dighton Bridge, Berkley/Dighton
Bourne Bridge, Bourne
The Bridge of Flowers, a historic bridge and tourist attraction in Shelburne Falls
Brightman Street Bridge, Fall River/Somerset
Calvin Coolidge Bridge, Northampton/Hadley
Canton Viaduct, Canton
Cape Cod Canal Railroad Bridge, Bourne
Charles M. Braga Jr. Memorial Bridge, Fall River/Somerset
French King Bridge, Erving/Gill
Harvard Bridge, Boston/Cambridge
Leonard P. Zakim Bunker Hill Memorial Bridge, Boston
Longfellow Bridge, Boston/Cambridge
Medford Pipe Bridge, an historic pedestrian bridge in Medford
Memorial Bridge, Springfield/West Springfield
Norwottuck Rail Trail Bridge, Northampton/Hadley
Sagamore Bridge, Bourne
Slade's Ferry Bridge, Fall River/Somerset
Tobin Bridge, Charlestown/Chelsea

See also
List of bridges documented by the Historic American Engineering Record in Massachusetts
List of bridges on the National Register of Historic Places in Massachusetts
List of crossings of the Connecticut River
List of crossings of the Housatonic River
List of waterways forming and crossings of the Atlantic Intracoastal Waterway

Michigan
Ada Covered Bridge, Ada
Ambassador Bridge, Detroit to Windsor, Ontario, Canada
Blue Water Bridge, Port Huron to Sarnia, Ontario, Canada
Cut River Bridge, Mackinac County
Fallasburg Bridge, Vergennes Township
Gateway Bridge, Taylor
Langley Covered Bridge, Centreville
MacArthur Bridge, Detroit mainland to Belle Isle Park
Mackinac Bridge, St. Ignace–Mackinaw City
Portage Lake Lift Bridge, Houghton to Hancock
Sault Ste. Marie International Bridge, Sault Ste. Marie, Michigan to Sault Ste. Marie, Ontario, Canada
Trunk Line Bridge No. 1
Whites Bridge, Keene Township
Zilwaukee Bridge, near Saginaw

See also
List of bridges documented by the Historic American Engineering Record in Michigan
List of bridges on the National Register of Historic Places in Michigan
List of Michigan covered bridges

Minnesota
10th Avenue Bridge, Minneapolis
Aerial Lift Bridge, Duluth
Cedar Avenue Bridge (Minnesota State Highway 77 Bridge), Bloomington–Burnsville
DeSoto Bridge, Saint Cloud
Franklin Avenue Bridge (Cappelen Memorial Bridge), Minneapolis
Hennepin Avenue Bridge, Minneapolis
High Bridge, Saint Paul
I-35W Mississippi River bridge (collapsed August 1, 2007), Minneapolis
Intercity Bridge (Ford Parkway Bridge), Minneapolis–Saint Paul
John A. Blatnik Bridge (Blatnik Bridge), Duluth
Mendota Bridge, Fort Snelling–Mendota
Richard I. Bong Memorial Bridge (Bong Bridge), Duluth
Robert Street Bridge, Saint Paul
Rock Island Swing Bridge (Rock Island Swing Bridge), St. Paul Park–Inver Grove Heights
Seventh Street Improvement Arches, Saint Paul
Stillwater Bridge (Stillwater Lift Bridge), Stillwater
Stone Arch Bridge, Minneapolis
Third Avenue Bridge, Minneapolis
Wabasha Street Bridge, Saint Paul
Washington Avenue Bridge, Minneapolis

See also
List of bridges documented by the Historic American Engineering Record in Minnesota
List of bridges on the National Register of Historic Places in Minnesota
List of crossings of the Minnesota River
List of crossings of the Mississippi River

Mississippi
Benjamin G. Humphreys Bridge
Biloxi Bay Bridge
Charles W. Dean Bridge
Coon Box Fork Bridge
Greenville Bridge
Helena Bridge
Mahned Bridge
Motley Slough Bridge
Natchez-Vidalia Bridge
Old Hill Place Bridge
Old Vicksburg Bridge
Pascagoula River High Rise Bridge
St. Louis Bay Bridge
Stuckey's Bridge
Vicksburg Bridge, Vicksburg
Woodburn Bridge
Woodrow Wilson Bridge
Youngblood Bridge

See also
List of bridges documented by the Historic American Engineering Record in Mississippi
List of bridges on the National Register of Historic Places in Mississippi
List of crossings of the Mississippi River
Waterways forming and crossings of the Gulf Intracoastal Waterway

Missouri
ASB Bridge, Kansas City
Bill Emerson Memorial Bridge, Cape Girardeau
Blanchette Memorial Bridge, St. Louis
Buck O'Neil Bridge, Kansas City
Chain of Rocks Bridge, St. Louis
Champ Clark Bridge (2019), Louisiana
Chouteau Bridge, Kansas City
Christopher S. Bond Bridge, Paseo Bridge replacement (June 1, 2011), Kansas City
Discovery Bridge (Missouri), St. Louis
Daniel Boone Bridge, St. Louis
Eads Bridge, St. Louis
Fairfax Bridge, Kansas City
Glasgow Bridge, Missouri, Glasgow
Hannibal Bridge, Kansas City
Heart of America Bridge, Kansas City
I-435 Bridge, Kansas City
Ike Skelton Bridge, Lexington
Jefferson Barracks Bridge, St. Louis
Jefferson City Bridge, Jefferson City
Lewis Bridge, Fort Bellefontaine, adjacent Bellefontaine Railroad Bridge
Liberty Bend Bridge, Kansas City
MacArthur Bridge, St. Louis
Mark Twain Memorial Bridge, Hannibal
Martin Luther King Bridge, St. Louis
McKinley Bridge, St. Louis
Miami Bridge, Miami
New Chain of Rocks Bridge, St. Louis
Paseo Bridge, Kansas City (demolished)
Platte Purchase Bridge, Kansas City
Poplar Street Bridge, St. Louis
Rocheport Bridge, Rocheport
Second Hannibal Bridge, Kansas City
Stan Musial Veterans Memorial Bridge, St. Louis
Veterans Memorial Bridge (Missouri), St. Louis
Washington Bridge (Washington, Missouri), St. Louis
Waverly Bridge (Missouri), Waverly
Y-Bridge, Galena

See also
List of bridges documented by the Historic American Engineering Record in Missouri
List of bridges on the National Register of Historic Places in Missouri
List of crossings of the Mississippi River
List of crossings of the Missouri River
List of Missouri covered bridges

Montana
Big Horn River Bridge
Dearborn River High Bridge
Fred Robinson Bridge
Hardy Bridge
Koocanusa Bridge, Rexford
Lewis and Clark Bridge
Locate Creek Bridge
Natural Pier Bridge
Powder River Bridge
Snowden Bridge
Tenth Street Bridge
Theodore Roosevelt Memorial Bridge
Toston Bridge
Yellowstone River Bridge

See also
List of bridges documented by the Historic American Engineering Record in Montana
List of bridges on the National Register of Historic Places in Montana
List of crossings of the Missouri River

Nebraska
Adamson Bridge
Ak-Sar-Ben Bridge
Ashland Bridge
Bell Bridge
Bellevue Bridge
Berry State Aid Bridge
Big Blue River Bridge (Grafton)
Big Blue River Bridge (Surprise)
Blair Bridge (road bridge)
Blair Bridge (railroad bridge)
Bob Kerrey Pedestrian Bridge
Borman Bridge
Brewer Bridge
Bridge
Brownville Bridge, Brownville, Nebraska
Bryan Bridge
Burt County Missouri River Bridge
Carns State Aid Bridge
Chief Standing Bear Memorial Bridge
Colclesser Bridge
Deering Bridge
Discovery Bridge
Franklin Bridge
Illinois Central Missouri River Bridge
Lewellen State Aid Bridge
Lewis Bridge
Lisco State Aid Bridge
Loosveldt Bridge
Meridian Highway Bridge
Mormon Bridge
Mynard Road Bridge
Nebraska City Bridge
Nine Bridges Bridge
Plattsmouth Bridge, Plattsmouth, Nebraska
Prairie Dog Creek Bridge
Rulo Rail Bridge
Saddle Creek Underpass
Sargent Bridge
Siouxland Veterans Memorial Bridge
South Omaha Veterans Memorial Bridge
Twin Bridge
Union Pacific Missouri River Bridge
Vermillion-Newcastle Bridge

See also
List of bridges documented by the Historic American Engineering Record in Nebraska
List of bridges on the National Register of Historic Places in Nebraska

Nevada

Galena Creek Bridge (Reno, Nevada)
Humboldt River Bridge
Mike O'Callaghan–Pat Tillman Memorial Bridge (Nevada–Arizona state line)
Virginia Street Bridge

New Hampshire
Arch Bridge, North Walpole to Bellows Falls, Vermont
Blair Bridge, Campton
Columbia Bridge, Columbia to Lemington, Vermont
Cornish–Windsor Covered Bridge, Cornish to Windsor, Vermont
Hampton Bridge, Hampton Beach to Seabrook
Janice Peaslee Bridge, Stratford to Maidstone, Vermont
Ledyard Bridge, Hanover to Norwich, Vermont
Little Bay Bridge, Newington to Dover
Memorial Bridge, Portsmouth to Kittery, Maine
Mount Orne Covered Bridge, Lancaster to Lunenburg, Vermont
Piscataqua River Bridge, Portsmouth to Kittery, Maine
Pittsburg–Clarksville Covered Bridge
Sarah Mildred Long Bridge, Portsmouth to Kittery, Maine
United States Navy Seabees Bridge, Chesterfield to Brattleboro, Vermont

See also
List of bridges documented by the Historic American Engineering Record in New Hampshire
List of bridges on the National Register of Historic Places in New Hampshire
List of crossings of the Connecticut River
List of New Hampshire covered bridges
List of waterways forming and crossings of the Atlantic Intracoastal Waterway

New Jersey
Basilone Bridge, Edison Township to New Brunswick
Bayonne Bridge, Bayonne to Staten Island, New York
Belleville Turnpike Bridge, Belleville, Kearny, and North Arlington
Benjamin Franklin Bridge, Camden to Philadelphia, Pennsylvania
Betsy Ross Bridge, Pennsauken to Philadelphia, Pennsylvania
Burlington-Bristol Bridge, Burlington to Bristol, Pennsylvania
Commodore Barry Bridge, Bridgeport to Chester, Pennsylvania
CRRNJ Newark Bay Bridge, Elizabeth to Bayonne
Delair Bridge, Pennsauken Township to Philadelphia, Pennsylvania
Delaware Memorial Bridge, Pennsville to New Castle, Delaware
Delaware River Viaduct, Columbia to Portland, Pennsylvania
Delaware Water Gap Toll Bridge, Hardwick Township to Delaware Water Gap, Pennsylvania
Dingman's Ferry Bridge, Sandyston Township and Delaware Township, Pike County, Pennsylvania
Driscoll Bridge, Woodbridge Township to Sayreville
Edison Bridge, Woodbridge Township to Sayreville
George Washington Bridge, Fort Lee to Manhattan
Goethals Bridge, Elizabeth to Staten Island, New York
Great Egg Harbor Bridge, Cape May County to Atlantic County via Garden State Parkway
Jackson Street Bridge, Newark and Harrison
Lower Hack Lift, Kearny to Jersey City
Milford–Montague Toll Bridge, Montague Township to Milford Township, Bucks County, Pennsylvania
Morrisville–Trenton Railroad Bridge, Trenton to Morrisville, Bucks County, Pennsylvania
New Hope – Lambertville Toll Bridge, Lambertville to New Hope, Pennsylvania
Newark Bay Bridge, Newark to Jersey City
Northampton Street Bridge, Phillipsburg to Easton, Pennsylvania
Outerbridge Crossing, Perth Amboy to Staten Island, New York
PATH Lift Bridge, Kearny to Jersey City
Portland-Columbia Toll Bridge, Columbia to Portland, Pennsylvania
Pulaski Skyway, Newark to Jersey City
Riegelsville Bridge, Riegelsville to Riegelsville, Pennsylvania
Riverside-Delanco Bridge, Riverside to Delanco
Tacony-Palmyra Bridge, Palmyra to the Tacony section of Philadelphia, Pennsylvania
Trenton-Morrisville Toll Bridge, Trenton to Morrisville, Bucks County, Pennsylvania
Walt Whitman Bridge, Gloucester City to Philadelphia, Pennsylvania
West Trenton Railroad Bridge, Ewing Township to Yardley, Pennsylvania
William A. Stickel Memorial Bridge, Newark to Harrison

See also
List of bridges documented by the Historic American Engineering Record in New Jersey
List of bridges on the National Register of Historic Places in New Jersey
List of bridges, tunnels, and cuts in Hudson County, New Jersey
List of crossings of the Delaware River
List of crossings of the Hackensack River
List of crossings of the Lower Passaic River
List of crossings of the Upper Passaic River
List of crossings of the Raritan River
List of waterways forming and crossings of the Atlantic Intracoastal Waterway

New Mexico
John Dunn Bridge, Arroyo Hondo, New Mexico
Rio Grande Gorge Bridge, Taos, New Mexico
Rio Puerco Bridge

See also
List of bridges documented by the Historic American Engineering Record in New Mexico
List of bridges on the National Register of Historic Places in New Mexico

New York
112th Street Bridge, Cohoes
145th Street Bridge, New York City
Alexander Hamilton Bridge, New York City
Alfred H. Smith Memorial Bridge, Castleton-on-Hudson
Arthur Kill Vertical Lift Bridge, New York City
Atlantic Beach Bridge, Long Island
Bayonne Bridge, New York City (Staten Island) to New Jersey
Bear Mountain Bridge, Westchester County to Orange County
Borden Avenue Bridge, New York City (Queens)
Broadway Bridge, New York City (Manhattan)
Bronx-Whitestone Bridge, New York City (Queens and the Bronx)
Brooklyn Bridge, New York City (Manhattan and Brooklyn)
Buffalo Skyway, Buffalo
City Island Bridge, New York City (the Bronx)
Collar City Bridge, Colonie to Troy
Congress Street Bridge, Troy
Cross Bay Veterans Memorial Bridge, New York City (Queens)
Dunn Memorial Bridge, Rensselaer
Frederick Douglass–Susan B. Anthony Memorial Bridge, Rochester
Ford Bridge, Long Island (Southampton and Montauk)
George Washington Bridge, New York City (Manhattan) to New Jersey
Goethals Bridge, New York City (Staten Island) to New Jersey
Green Island Bridge, Troy
Greenpoint Avenue Bridge, New York City (Queens and Brooklyn)
Hell Gate Bridge, New York City (Queens and the Bronx)
Henry Hudson Bridge, New York City (Manhattan and the Bronx)
High Bridge, New York City
Hudson River Way, Albany
Irondequoit Bay Bridge, Irondequoit to Webster
Joseph P. Addabbo Memorial Bridge, New York City (Queens)
Kingston-Rhinecliff Bridge, across the Hudson River
Kosciuszko Bridge, New York City (Queens and Brooklyn)
Lewiston-Queenston Bridge, Lewiston, New York to Queenston, Ontario, Canada
Livingston Avenue Bridge, Albany
Macombs Dam Bridge, New York City (Manhattan and the Bronx)
Madison Avenue Bridge, New York City (Manhattan and the Bronx)
Manhattan Bridge, New York City (Manhattan and Brooklyn)
Marine Parkway–Gil Hodges Memorial Bridge, New York City (Queens and Brooklyn)
Mechanicville Bridge, Mechanicville
Menands Bridge, Menands
Mid-Hudson Bridge, near Poughkeepsie
Newburgh-Beacon Bridge, Newburgh
North Grand Island Bridge, Grand Island to Niagara Falls
Ogdensburg-Prescott International Bridge, Ogdensburg, New York to Johnstown, Ontario
Old Blenheim Bridge, North Blenheim
Outerbridge Crossing, New York City (Staten Island) to New Jersey
Park Avenue Bridge, New York City (Manhattan and the Bronx)
Patroon Island Bridge, Albany
Peace Bridge, Buffalo to Fort Erie, Ontario, Canada
Pelham Bridge, New York City (the Bronx)
Ponquogue Bridge, Long Island
Poughkeepsie Bridge, Poughkeepsie
Pulaski Bridge, New York City (Queens and Brooklyn)
Queensboro Bridge, New York City (Manhattan and Queens)
Rainbow Bridge, Niagara Falls, New York to Niagara Falls, Ontario, Canada
Rexford Bridge, Rexford
Rikers Island Bridge, New York City
Rip Van Winkle Bridge, Catskill
Robert Moses Causeway, Long Island
Roebling's Delaware Aqueduct, Minisink Ford
Roosevelt Island Bridge, New York City (Roosevelt Island and Queens)
Schuylerville Bridge, Schuylerville
South Grand Island Bridge, Grand Island to Buffalo
Spuyten Duyvil Bridge, New York City (Manhattan and the Bronx)
Tappan Zee Bridge, Rockland County and Westchester County
Thaddeus Kosciusko Bridge, Albany
Third Avenue Bridge, New York City
Thousand Islands Bridge, to Ontario, Canada
Throgs Neck Bridge, New York City (Queens and the Bronx)
Triborough Bridge, New York City (Queens, Manhattan, and the Bronx)
Troy-Waterford Bridge, Waterford
University Heights Bridge, New York City (Manhattan and the Bronx)
Verrazano-Narrows Bridge, New York City (Brooklyn and Staten Island)
Ward's Island Bridge, New York City (Manhattan and the Bronx)
Washington Bridge, New York City (Manhattan and the Bronx)
Whirlpool Rapids Bridge, Niagara Falls, New York to Niagara Falls, Ontario, Canada
Williamsburg Bridge, New York City (Manhattan and Brooklyn)
Willis Avenue Bridge, New York City (Manhattan and the Bronx)

See also
List of bridges documented by the Historic American Engineering Record in New York (state)
List of bridges on the National Register of Historic Places in New York
List of crossings of the Delaware River
List of crossings of the Genesee River
List of crossings of the Harlem River
List of crossings of the Hudson River
List of fixed crossings of the East River
List of New York covered bridges
List of waterways forming and crossings of the Atlantic Intracoastal Waterway
List of bridges and tunnels in New York City

North Carolina
Cape Fear Memorial Bridge, Wilmington
Herbert C. Bonner Bridge, Dare County
Laurel Creek Gorge Bridge, Mars Hill
Linn Cove Viaduct, Grandfather Mountain
Pisgah Covered Bridge, Randolph County
Virginia Dare Memorial Bridge, Manteo
William B. Umstead Bridge, Manteo
Wright Memorial Bridge, Dare County

See also
List of bridges documented by the Historic American Engineering Record in North Carolina
List of bridges on the National Register of Historic Places in North Carolina
List of waterways forming and crossings of the Atlantic Intracoastal Waterway

North Dakota
Beaver Creek Bridge
Blanchard Bridge
Caledonia Bridge
Cedar Creek Bridge
Colton's Crossing Bridge
Crystal Bridge
Eastwood Park Bridge
Elliott Bridge
Fairview Lift Bridge
Fargo-Moorhead Toll Bridge
Four Bears Bridge
Goose River Bridge
Grace City Bridge
Great Northern Railway Underpass
Hi-Line Railroad Bridge
Knife River Bridge near Stanton
Liberty Memorial Bridge
Lisbon Bridge
Lost Bridge
Midland Continental Overpass
Midway Bridge
Nesheim Bridge
New Rockford Bridge
Northwood Bridge
Norway Bridge
Ost Valle Bridge
Porter Elliott Bridge
Portland Park Bridge
Rainbow Arch Bridge
Romness Bridge
Sorlie Memorial Bridge, Grand Forks
Viking Bridge
West Antelope Bridge
West Park Bridge
Westgaard Bridge

See also
List of bridges documented by the Historic American Engineering Record in North Dakota
List of bridges on the National Register of Historic Places in North Dakota

Ohio
Anthony Wayne Bridge, Toledo
Carl Perkins Bridge, Portsmouth to Greenup County, Kentucky
Charles Berry Bridge, Lorain
Detroit-Superior Bridge (Veterans' Memorial Bridge), Cleveland
George V. Voinovich Bridges, Cleveland
Hope Memorial Bridge, Cleveland
Innerbelt Bridge (demolished 2014), Cleveland
Lofton Henderson Memorial Bridge, Lorain
Valley View Bridge, Garfield Heights to Independence
Jeremiah Morrow Bridge, Fort Ancient to Oregonia
Lane Avenue Bridge, Columbus
Main Avenue Bridge, Cleveland
Silver Memorial Bridge, Gallipolis to Henderson, West Virginia
Simon Kenton Memorial Bridge, Aberdeen to Maysville, Kentucky
Smolen-Gulf Bridge, connects Ashtabula Township to Plymouth Township
Thomas Alva Edison Memorial Bridge, Bay View to Marblehead
Veterans' Glass City Skyway, Toledo
William H. Harsha Bridge, connects Aberdeen to Maysville, Kentucky
Zanesville Y-Bridge, "Y" shaped bridge, Zanesville

See also
List of Ashtabula County covered bridges
List of bridges documented by the Historic American Engineering Record in Ohio
List of bridges on the National Register of Historic Places in Ohio
List of crossings of the Ohio River
List of Ohio covered bridges
List of Madison County Covered Bridges
Parke County Covered Bridges

Oklahoma
11th Street Bridge
Allen Williamson Bridge
James C. Nance Memorial Bridge
State Highway No. 78 Bridge at the Red River
Wanette-Byars Bridge

See also
List of bridges documented by the Historic American Engineering Record in Oklahoma
List of bridges on the National Register of Historic Places in Oklahoma

Oregon
Abernethy Bridge, Oregon City
Alsea Bay Bridge, Waldport
Astoria-Megler Bridge, from Astoria to Megler, Washington
Big Creek Bridge, Lane County
Bridge of the Gods, Cascade Locks
Broadway Bridge, Portland
Bullards Bridge, Bandon
Burlington Northern Railroad Bridge 5.1, Portland
Burlington Northern Railroad Bridge 9.6, Portland to Vancouver, Washington
Burnside Bridge, Portland
Cape Creek Bridge, Lane County
Center Street Bridge, Salem
Conde McCullough Memorial Bridge, Coos Bay
Crooked River High Bridge, Jefferson County
Fremont Bridge, Portland
Glenn L. Jackson Memorial Bridge, Portland to Vancouver, Washington
Hawthorne Bridge, Portland
Hayden Bridge, Alsea
Hayden Bridge, Springfield
Holcomb Creek Trestle, Helvetia
Hood River Bridge, Hood River to White Salmon, Washington
Interstate Bridge, Portland
Isaac Lee Patterson Bridge, Gold Beach
John McLoughlin Bridge, Oregon City
Lake Oswego Railroad Bridge, Lake Oswego to Milwaukie
Lewis and Clark Bridge, Rainier to Longview, Washington
Lewis and Clark River Bridge, Clatsop County
Marion Street Bridge, Salem
Marquam Bridge, Portland
Morrison Bridge, Portland
Oregon City Bridge, Oregon City to West Linn
Oregon Slough Railroad Bridge, Portland
Oregon Trunk Rail Bridge, Wasco County to Wishram, Washington
Ross Island Bridge, Portland
Sam Hill Memorial Bridge, Biggs Junction to Maryhill, Washington
Sauvie Island Bridge, Portland metropolitan area
Sellwood Bridge, Portland
St. Johns Bridge, Portland
Steel Bridge, Portland
Siuslaw River Bridge, Florence
Ten Mile Creek Bridge, near Yachats
The Dalles Bridge, The Dalles to Dallesport, Washington
Tilikum Crossing (also known as Portland–Milwaukie Light Rail Bridge), Portland
Umpqua River Bridge, Reedsport
Union Street Railroad Bridge, Salem
Yaquina Bay Bridge, Newport

See also
List of bridges documented by the Historic American Engineering Record in Oregon]
List of bridges on the National Register of Historic Places in Oregon
List of crossings of the Willamette River
List of Oregon covered bridges

Pennsylvania
Adams Avenue Bridge, Philadelphia
Albertus L. Meyers Bridge, Allentown
 B&O Railroad Bridge, Philadelphia
Beaver Bridge, Beaver
Bellbank Bridge, between Colerain Township and Upper Oxford Township
Benjamin Franklin Bridge, Center City Philadelphia to Camden, New Jersey
Betsy Ross Bridge, Northeast Philadelphia to New Jersey
Burlington-Bristol Bridge, Bristol to Burlington, New Jersey
Chestnut Street Bridge, Philadelphia
Columbia Railroad Bridge, Philadelphia
Commodore Barry Bridge, Chester to New Jersey
Falls Bridge, Philadelphia
Fort Duquesne Bridge, Pittsburgh
Fort Pitt Bridge, Pittsburgh
Frankford Avenue Bridge, Northeast Philadelphia
Girard Avenue Bridge, Philadelphia
Girard Point Bridge, Philadelphia
Gray's Ferry Bridge, Philadelphia
Hill to Hill Bridge, Bethlehem
Holme Avenue Bridge, Philadelphia
M. Harvey Taylor Memorial Bridge, Harrisburg
Market Street Bridge, Harrisburg
Mulberry Street Bridge, Harrisburg
George C. Platt Bridge, Philadelphia
Pennsylvania Railroad Old Bridge over Standing Stone Creek, Huntingdon
Poquessing Creek Bridge, Philadelphia/Andalusia
Schuylkill Arsenal Railroad Bridge, Philadelphia
Sewickley Bridge, Sewickley
Smithfield Street Bridge, Pittsburgh
Starrucca Viaduct, Susquehanna County
State Street Bridge, Harrisburg
Strawberry Mansion Bridge, Philadelphia
Susquehanna River Bridge, Harrisburg
Tacony-Palmyra Bridge, Tacony, Philadelphia to Palmyra, New Jersey
Thomas Mill Covered Bridge, Fairmount Park, Philadelphia
Three Sisters Bridges, Pittsburgh
Tunkhannock Viaduct, Nicholson
University Avenue Bridge, Philadelphia
Vine Street Expressway Bridge, Philadelphia
Walnut Lane Bridge, Philadelphia
Walnut Lane Memorial Bridge, Philadelphia
Walnut Street Bridge, Harrisburg
Walnut Street Bridge, Philadelphia
Walt Whitman Bridge, South Philadelphia to Gloucester City, New Jersey
Washington Crossing Bridge, Washington Crossing
West End Bridge, Pittsburgh
West River Drive Bridge, Philadelphia

See also
List of bridges documented by the Historic American Engineering Record in Pennsylvania
List of bridges on the National Register of Historic Places in Pennsylvania
List of covered bridges in Lancaster County, Pennsylvania
List of covered bridges of Bradford, Sullivan and Lycoming Counties
Pittsburgh bridges
List of crossings of the Allegheny River in Pennsylvania
List of crossings of the Conestoga River
List of crossings of the Delaware River
List of crossings of the Monongahela River in Pennsylvania
List of crossings of the Ohio River in Pennsylvania
List of crossings of the Schuylkill River
List of crossings of the Susquehanna River

Rhode Island
Claiborne Pell Newport Bridge, Newport
Crawford Street Bridge, Providence
Henderson Bridge, Providence
Iway Bridge, Providence
Jamestown Verrazzano Bridge, Jamestown
Mount Hope Bridge, Bristol
Point Street Bridge, Providence
Sakonnet River Bridge, Tiverton
Washington Bridge, Providence

See also
List of bridges documented by the Historic American Engineering Record in Rhode Island
List of bridges on the National Register of Historic Places in Rhode Island
List of waterways forming and crossings of the Atlantic Intracoastal Waterway

South Carolina
Arthur Ravenel Jr. Bridge, Charleston to Mount Pleasant
Campbells Covered Bridge, Gowensville
Don N. Holt Bridge, Charleston to North Charleston
Gervais Street Bridge, Lexington County, South Carolina to Richland County, South Carolina
James B. Edwards Bridge, Charleston to Mount Pleasant
Waccamaw River Memorial Bridge, Conway

See also
List of bridges documented by the Historic American Engineering Record in South Carolina
List of bridges on the National Register of Historic Places in South Carolina
List of waterways forming and crossings of the Atlantic Intracoastal Waterway

South Dakota
Capa Bridge
Chamberlain Bridge
Chief Standing Bear Memorial Bridge
Discovery Bridge
Eighth Street Bridge
Lewis Bridge
Meridian Highway Bridge
Miller Ree Creek Bridge
Old Cochrane Road Bridge
Old Redwater Bridge
South Dakota Department of Transportation Bridge No. 02-007-220
South Dakota Dept. of Transportation Bridge No. 20-153-210
South Dakota Dept. of Transportation Bridge No. 30-257-400
South Dakota Dept. of Transportation Bridge No. 48-244-204
South Dakota Dept. of Transportation Bridge No. 49-095-190
South Dakota Highway 44 Bridge, 14 miles west of Platte.  The longest bridge in South Dakota
Stamford Bridge
Vermillion-Newcastle Bridge

See also
List of bridges documented by the Historic American Engineering Record in South Dakota
List of bridges on the National Register of Historic Places in South Dakota

Tennessee
Frisco Bridge, Memphis
Gay Street Bridge, Knoxville
Henley Street Bridge, Knoxville
Harahan Bridge, Memphis
Interstate 24 Bridge, Marion County
Marion Memorial Bridge, Marion County
Market Street Bridge, or John Ross Bridge, Chattanooga
Memphis & Arkansas Bridge, Memphis
Natchez Trace Parkway Bridge, Williamson County
P. R. Olgiati Bridge, Chattanooga
Shelby Reinhart Bridge, Marion County
Shelby Street Bridge, Nashville
Hernando de Soto Bridge, Memphis
Tenbridge, Chattanooga
Veterans Memorial Bridge, Chattanooga
Walnut Street Bridge, Chattanooga

See also
List of bridges documented by the Historic American Engineering Record in Tennessee
List of bridges on the National Register of Historic Places in Tennessee
List of crossings of the Tennessee River
List of dams and reservoirs of the Tennessee River

Texas
Anzalduas International Bridge, Mission, Texas to Reynosa, Tamaulipas
Bridge of the Americas, El Paso to Ciudad Juárez, Chihuahua
Brownsville & Matamoros International Bridge, Brownsville to Matamoros, Tamaulipas, crosses Rio Grande and United States–Mexico border
Camino Real International Bridge, Eagle Pass to Piedras Negras, Coahuila
Colombia-Solidarity International Bridge, Laredo to Colombia, Nuevo León, crosses Rio Grande and United States–Mexico border
Colorado River Bridge, Bastrop
Continental Avenue Bridge, Dallas
Corpus Christi Harbor Bridge, Corpus Christi
Del Río-Ciudad Acuña International Bridge, Del Rio to Ciudad Acuña, Coahuila
Eagle Pass-Piedras Negras International Bridge, Eagle Pass to Piedras Negras, Coahuila
Fabens-Caseta International Bridge, Tornillo, Texas to Guadalupe, Chihuahua
Fort Hancock-El Porvenir International Bridge, Fort Hancock to El Porvenir, Chihuahua
Fred Hartman Bridge, Baytown and La Porte, crosses the Houston Ship Channel
Free Trade International Bridge, crosses Rio Grande from Los Indios, Texas to Matamoros, Tamaulipas
Galveston Causeway, crosses West Bay to Galveston Island
Gateway International Bridge, Brownsville to Matamoros, Tamaulipas, crosses Rio Grande and United States–Mexico border
Gateway to the Americas International Bridge, Laredo to Nuevo Laredo, Tamaulipas, crosses Rio Grande and United States–Mexico border
Good Neighbor International Bridge, South Mesa Street, El Paso, to Ciudad Juárez, Chihuahua
Juárez-Lincoln International Bridge, Laredo to Nuevo Laredo, Tamaulipas, crosses Rio Grande and United States–Mexico border
La Linda International Bridge (Gerstaker Bridge), Heath Canyon to La Linda, Coahuila (The bridge was shut down in 1997)
Lake Amistad Dam International Crossing, Del Rio to Ciudad Acuña, Coahuila
Lake Falcon Dam International Crossing, Falcon Heights to Nueva Ciudad Guerrero, Tamaulipas
Lewisville Lake Toll Bridge, Denton County, crossing Lewisville Lake
Margaret Hunt Hill Bridge, Dallas, Texas
Margaret McDermott Bridge, Dallas
Martin Luther King Bridge, Port Arthur
McAllen-Hidalgo-Reynosa International Bridge, McAllen and Hidalgo to Reynosa, Tamaulipas
Mountain Creek Lake Bridge, Dallas County
Paso del Norte International Bridge, Santa Fe Street, El Paso, Texas to Ciudad Juárez, Chihuahua
Pennybacker Bridge, Austin
Pharr-Reynosa International Bridge, Pharr to Reynosa, Tamaulipas
Presidio-Ojinaga International Bridge, Presidio to Ojinaga, Chihuahua
Progreso-Nuevo Progreso International Bridge, Progreso to Nuevo Progreso, Tamaulipas
Rainbow Bridge, Port Arthur to Bridge City
Regency Bridge, crosses the Colorado River in Mills County
Rio Grande City-Camargo International Bridge, Rio Grande City to Ciudad Camargo, Tamaulipas
Roma-Ciudad Miguel Alemán International Bridge, Roma to Ciudad Miguel Alemán, Tamaulipas
Sam Houston Ship Channel Bridge, Harris County, crosses the Houston Ship Channel
Sidney Sherman Bridge, Houston, crosses the Houston Ship Channel
Texas-Mexican Railway International Bridge, crosses the Rio Grande, connecting Laredo and Nuevo Laredo, Tamaulipas
Union Pacific International Railroad Bridge, Eagle Pass to Piedras Negras, Coahuila
Veteran's International Bridge, crosses the Rio Grande, Brownsville to Matamoros, Tamaulipas
Waco Suspension Bridge, Waco
World Trade International Bridge, crosses the Rio Grande, connects Laredo and Nuevo Laredo, Tamaulipas
Ysleta-Zaragoza International Bridge, Zaragosa Street, El Paso to Ciudad Juárez, Chihuahua

See also
List of bridges documented by the Historic American Engineering Record in Texas
List of bridges on the National Register of Historic Places in Texas

Utah
Cable Creek Bridge
Dewey Bridge (Utah)
Hite Crossing Bridge
Lincoln Highway Bridge
Murphy Trail and Bridge
Rockville Bridge
Sam White Bridge
San Rafael Bridge
U.S. Route 191 Bridge over the Colorado River adjacent to Arches National Park

See also
List of bridges documented by the Historic American Engineering Record in Utah
List of bridges on the National Register of Historic Places in Utah

Vermont
Bridge 12
Brookline-Newfane Bridge
Browns River Covered Bridge
Burt Henry Covered Bridge, Bennington
Champlain Bridge, Addison to Crown Point, New York
Cheshire Bridge
Colburn Bridge
Cold River Bridge
Creamery Covered Bridge
Fisher Covered Railroad Bridge
Hall Covered Bridge
Medburyville Bridge
Museum Covered Bridge
Rice Farm Road Bridge
Sacketts Brook Stone Arch Bridge
Scott Covered Bridge
Simpsonville Stone Arch Bridge
South Newfane Bridge
Spade Farm Covered Bridge
Taylor Street Bridge
West Townshend Stone Arch Bridge
Williams River Route 5 Bridge
Williamsville Covered Bridge
Worrall Covered Bridge

See also
List of bridges documented by the Historic American Engineering Record in Vermont
List of bridges on the National Register of Historic Places in Vermont
List of crossings of the Connecticut River
List of covered bridges in Vermont
List of non-authentic covered bridges in Vermont

Virginia
14th Street Bridge, I-395 and US 1 across Potomac River between Arlington County and Washington, D.C.
Berkley Bridge, I-264 across Elizabeth River in Norfolk
Boulevard Bridge, VA 161 toll bridge across James River in Richmond
Charles Hardaway Marks Bridges, VA 10 across Appomattox River near Hopewell
Chesapeake Bay Bridge-Tunnel, US 13 between Virginia Beach and Eastern Shore
Edward E. Willey Bridge, VA 150 across James River between Henrico County and Richmond
George P. Coleman Memorial Bridge, US 17 across York River between Yorktown, Virginia and Gloucester County
Governor Harry W. Nice Memorial Bridge, US 301 across Potomac River between Dahlgren and Maryland
Hampton Roads Bridge-Tunnel, I-64 and US 60 between Norfolk and Hampton
Huguenot Memorial Bridge, VA 147 across James River between Henrico County and Richmond
James River Bridge, I-95 in Richmond
James River Bridge, US 17 across James River between Isle of Wight County and Newport News
Manchester Bridge, US 60 across James River in Richmond
Martin Luther King Jr. Memorial Bridge, US 1 and US 301 across Appomattox River between Colonial Heights and Petersburg
Mayo Bridge, US 360 across James River in Richmond
Monitor–Merrimac Memorial Bridge–Tunnel, I-664 across Hampton Roads between Suffolk and Newport News
Peninsula Subdivision Trestle, CSX Transportation Peninsula Subdivision in Richmond
Powhite Parkway Bridge, VA 76 toll bridge across James River in Richmond
Rivanna Subdivision Trestle, CSX Transportation Rivanna Subdivision in Richmond
Robert E. Lee Memorial Bridge, US 1 and US 301 across James River in Richmond
Theodore Roosevelt Bridge, I-66 and US 50 across Potomac River between Arlington County and Washington, D.C.
Varina-Enon Bridge, I-295 across James River between Henrico and Chesterfield counties
Vietnam Veterans Memorial Bridge, VA 895 toll bridge across James River between Richmond and Henrico County
Wilson Creek Bridge a.k.a. the Smart Road Bridge, Montgomery County
Woodrow Wilson Bridge, I-95 and I-495 across Potomac River from Alexandria through Washington, D.C. to Maryland
World War II Veterans Memorial Bridge, VA-288 across James River between Powhatan and Goochland counties

See also
List of bridges documented by the Historic American Engineering Record in Virginia
List of bridges on the National Register of Historic Places in Virginia
List of crossings of the Potomac River
List of Virginia covered bridges
List of waterways forming and crossings of the Atlantic Intracoastal Waterway

Washington

20th Avenue NE Bridge, Seattle
Agate Pass Bridge, Suquamish
Alaskan Way Viaduct, Seattle
Arboretum Sewer Trestle, Seattle
Astoria-Megler Bridge, Megler to Astoria, Oregon
Ballard Bridge, Seattle
Beebe Bridge, Chelan
Benton City-Kiona Bridge, Kiona
Beverly Railroad Bridge, Beverly
Blue Bridge (Pioneer Memorial Bridge), Kennewick to Pasco
Bridge of the Gods, Fort Rains to Cascade Locks, Oregon
Burlington Northern Railroad Bridge 9.6, Vancouver (Washington) to Portland, Oregon
Cable Bridge (Ed Hendler Bridge), Kennewick to Pasco
Christine Falls Bridge, Paradise
Cowen Park Bridge, Seattle
Curlew Bridge, Curlew
Deception Pass Bridge, Whidbey Island to Fidalgo Island
Dodger Point Bridge, Elwha Valley
Dungeness River Bridge, Sequim
Evergreen Point Floating Bridge, Seattle
East 21st Street Bridge, Tacoma
East 34th Street Bridge, Tacoma
East Channel Bridge, Seattle
Elwha River Bridge, Elwha
Fairfax Bridge, Melmont
First Avenue South Bridge, Seattle
Fred G. Redmon Bridge, Yakima
Fremont Bridge, Seattle
George Washington Memorial Bridge, Seattle
Glenn L. Jackson Memorial Bridge, Vancouver to Portland, Oregon
Grays River Covered Bridge, Wahkiakum County
Grand Coulee Bridge
High Steel Bridge, Mason County
Homer M. Hadley Memorial Bridge (Third Lake Washington Bridge), Seattle
Hood Canal Bridge, Kitsap County
Hood River Bridge, White Salmon to Hood River, Oregon
Interstate Bridge, Vancouver to Portland, Oregon
Interstate 182 Bridge, Richland to Pasco
Julia Butler Hansen Bridge, Cathlamet
Jose Rizal Bridge, Seattle
Kettle Falls Bridges, Kettle Falls
Lacey V. Murrow Memorial Bridge, Seattle to Mercer Island
Lewis and Clark Bridge (Columbia River), Longview
Magnolia Bridge, Seattle
Manette Bridge, Bremerton
Mark Clark Bridge, Stanwood
McMillin Bridge
Montlake Bridge, Seattle
Monroe Street Bridge, Spokane
Murray Morgan Bridge, Tacoma
Narada Falls Bridge, Paradise
North Queen Anne Drive Bridge, Seattle
Oregon Trunk Rail Bridge, Wishram
Pasco–Kennewick Bridge (1922) (demolished)
Purdy Bridge, Purdy
Rock Island Railroad Bridge, Rock Island
Rosalia Railroad Bridge, Rosalia
Salmon Bay Bridge, Seattle
Sam Hill Memorial Bridge
Schmitz Park Bridge, Seattle
Ship Canal Bridge, Seattle
Snake River Bridge, Lyons Ferry
South Park Bridge, Seattle
South Puyallup River Bridge, Nisqually Entrance
St. Andrews Creek Bridge, Nisqually Entrance
Spokane Street Bridge, Seattle
Tacoma Narrows Bridge, Tacoma to Gig Harbor
The Dalles Bridge, Dallesport to The Dalles, Oregon
University Bridge, Seattle
Umatilla Bridge
Vantage Bridge, Vantage
Vernita Bridge,
West Seattle Bridge, Seattle
Wilburton Trestle, Bellevue
Winnifred Street Bridge, Ruston
Yale Bridge, Yale

See also
List of bridges documented by the Historic American Engineering Record in Washington (state)
List of bridges on the National Register of Historic Places in Washington
List of crossings of the Columbia River

West Virginia
35th Street Bridge, Charleston
Alderson Bridge, Alderson
B & O Railroad Potomac River Crossing, Harpers Ferry to Maryland Heights, Maryland
Bellaire Bridge, Benwood to Bellaire, Ohio
Blennerhassett Island Bridge, Parkersburg to Belpre, Ohio
Bridgeport Bridge, Wheeling to Bridgeport, Ohio
Carrollton Covered Bridge, Barbour County
Clifford Hollow Bridge, Moorefield
David Morgan Bridge, Fairmont
East Huntington Bridge (East End Bridge), Huntington
Fort Henry Bridge, Wheeling
Hi Carpenter Memorial Bridge, St. Marys to Newport, Ohio
Indian Creek Covered Bridge, Monroe County
Interstate 470 Bridge, Wheeling to Bridgeport, Ohio
Jennings Randolph Bridge, Chester to East Liverpool, Ohio
Marietta–Williamstown Interstate Bridge, Williamstown to Marietta, Ohio
Military Order of the Purple Heart Bridge, Wheeling Island to Bridgeport, Ohio
Moundsville Bridge, Moundsville to Belmont County, Ohio
New Martinsville Bridge, New Martinsville to Hannibal, Ohio
New River Gorge Bridge, Fayetteville
Parkersburg–Belpre Bridge, Parkersburg to Belpre, Ohio
Philippi Covered Bridge, Philippi
Point Pleasant Rail Bridge, Point Pleasant to Gallia County, Ohio
Pomeroy–Mason Bridge, Mason to Pomeroy, Ohio
Ravenswood Bridge, Ravenswood to Meigs County, Ohio
Robert C. Byrd Bridge, Huntington to Chesapeake, Ohio
Robert H. Mollohan-Jefferson Street Bridge, Fairmont
Silver Bridge, Point Pleasant to Gallipolis, Ohio
Silver Memorial Bridge, Henderson to Gallipolis, Ohio
Star City Bridge, Star City
Veterans Memorial Bridge, Weirton to Steubenville, Ohio
West Huntington Bridge, Huntington
Wheeling Suspension Bridge, Wheeling
Williamstown Bridge, Williamstown to Marietta, Ohio

See also
List of bridges documented by the Historic American Engineering Record in West Virginia
List of bridges on the National Register of Historic Places in West Virginia
List of crossings of the Potomac River
List of West Virginia covered bridges

Wisconsin
Black Hawk Bridge, Crawford County to Lansing, Iowa
Eagle Point Bridge, Grant County to Dubuque, Iowa
Hoan Bridge, carries Interstate 794 over the Port of Milwaukee; Milwaukee
John A. Blatnik Bridge, Superior to Duluth, MN
Leo Frigo Memorial Bridge, carries Interstate 43 over the Fox River; Green Bay
Richard I. Bong Memorial Bridge, Superior to Duluth, Minnesota
Marquette-Joliet Bridge, Prairie du Chien to Marquette, Iowa
Interstate Bridge, Marinette Wisconsin to Menominee, MI
Sturgeon Bay Bridge, Sturgeon Bay

See also
List of bridges documented by the Historic American Engineering Record in Wisconsin
List of bridges on the National Register of Historic Places in Wisconsin
List of crossings of the Mississippi River

Wyoming
AJX Bridge over South Fork and Powder River
BMU Bridge over Wind River
Chittenden Memorial Bridge
CKW Bridge over Powder River
CQA Four Mile Bridge
Dale Creek Crossing
DDZ Bridge over New Fork River
DFU Elk Mountain Bridge
DMJ Pick Bridge
DML Butler Bridge
DOE Bridge over Laramie River
DSD Bridge over Cheyenne River
DUX Bessemer Bend Bridge
DXN Bridge
EAU Arvada Bridge
EBF Bridge over Powder River
ECR Kooi Bridge
ECS Bridge over Big Goose Creek
EDL Peloux Bridge
EDZ Irigary Bridge
EFP Bridge over Owl Creek
EJE Bridge over Shell Creek
EJP County Line Bridge
EJZ Bridge over Shoshone River
ELS Bridge over Big Wind River
ELY Wind River Diversion Dam Bridge
ENP Bridge over Green River
ERT Bridge over Black's Fork
ETD Bridge over Green River
ETR Big Island Bridge
EWZ Bridge over East Channel of Laramie River
Hayden Arch Bridge
Rairden Bridge

See also
List of bridges documented by the Historic American Engineering Record in Wyoming
List of bridges on the National Register of Historic Places in Wyoming

See also

List of bridges

References